Edward Joseph Burns (born December 7, 1954) is a former American football quarterback who played for the New Orleans Saints of the National Football League (NFL). He played college football at University of Nebraska-Lincoln.

References 

1954 births
Living people
Players of American football from Iowa
American football quarterbacks
Nebraska Cornhuskers football players
New Orleans Saints players